Everything's Gone Green is a 2006 Canadian comedy film directed by Paul Fox and written by Douglas Coupland. It was produced by Elizabeth Yake, True West Films and Chris Nanos, Radke Films. The distributor is ThinkFilm in Canada, and Shoreline Entertainment elsewhere and won the award for Best Canadian Feature Film at the 2006 Vancouver International Film Festival.

Plot
Ryan, a good-natured slacker in his twenties, is dumped by his girlfriend and kicked out of their apartment, and, on arriving late to work, is suspended (pending psychological tests) from his job at an anonymous IT corporation. On receiving a phone call from his family saying they have won the jackpot of 4.3 million dollars on the BC lottery, he trashes his office space, and resigns. Unfortunately, when he calls the lottery "Win Line" he discovers they haven't actually won anything. By happy accident, Ryan is offered a job with the lottery bureau interviewing and photographing lottery winners. En route to the job interview he stops to see a beached whale and meets Ming, a set designer in a relationship with golf-course designer and scam artist Bryce.

Ryan is enticed by Bryce into participating in a lucrative money-laundering scheme involving new lottery winners, and after the euphoria of new-found wealth wears off is forced to choose between working with Bryce and winning over an increasingly sceptical Ming. Additional complications arise when Ryan discovers that his parents are operating a marijuana grow-op in the family basement, and when he re-visits lottery winners to discover that they are often worse off than they were before winning.

Cast

Soundtrack
A soundtrack album was released on CD by Lakeshore Records in 2007, titled Everything's Gone Green: Original Motion Picture Soundtrack. The Meligrove Band appeared on MTV Live to promote its release.

Songs
 No Satisfaction - Black Mountain
 Hangover Days - Jason Collett
 Birdsong - The Golden Dogs
 The CN Tower Belongs to the Dead - Final Fantasy
 Fire - Jason Collett
 Everything You've Done Wrong - Sloan
 Little Saddy - Andre Ethier
 Break You - Hawaii
 Violet Light - Raised by Swans
 Skunks - Caribou
 97 and 02 - Circlesquare
 I Gotta Plan (for Saturday Night) - The Deadly Snakes
 Monkey Mask - The Meligrove Band
 Small Town Murder Scene - The Fembots

References

External links
 
 
 Everything's Gone Green review at Reel Film Reviews.

2006 films
Canadian comedy films
2006 comedy films
English-language Canadian films
Films with screenplays by Douglas Coupland
Films set in Vancouver
Shoreline Entertainment films
Films directed by Paul Fox
2000s English-language films
2000s Canadian films